The following is a list of professional wrestlers, referees, announcers, and other personnel who currently work for Ring of Honor (ROH), a wrestling promotion owned by Tony Khan.

Employees and management listed are organized according to their role in the company. The ring name of each employee appears in the first column, while their real name is in the second column. ROH bills their developmental wrestlers working their way through the ROH Dojo (regardless of gender) as the "Future of Honor" and their women wrestlers as the "Women of Honor".

Wrestlers from ROH's sister promotion All Elite Wrestling (AEW) may also make periodic appearances on ROH programming.

Management

Roster

Men's division

Women's division

Other on-air personnel

Broadcast team

See also 
 List of Ring of Honor alumni
 List of professional wrestlers

References

External links 
 Official website
 ROH roster

personnel
Ring of Honor employees